DR-4485 is a compound which acts as a potent and selective antagonist for the 5-HT7 receptor, with good oral bioavailability. It has been used to research the function of this still comparatively little studied serotonin receptor subtype.

References 

Serotonin receptor antagonists
5-HT7 antagonists